The 52nd Directors Guild of America Awards, honoring the outstanding directorial achievements in films, documentary and television in 1999, were presented on March 11, 2000 at the Hyatt Regency Century Plaza. The ceremony was hosted by Carl Reiner. The nominees in the feature film category were announced on January 24, 2000 and the other nominations were announced starting on February 1, 2000.

Winners and nominees

Film

Television

Commercials

Lifetime Achievement in Feature Film
 Steven Spielberg

Lifetime Achievement in Sports Direction
 Chet Forte

Frank Capra Achievement Award
 Cheryl R. Downey

Franklin J. Schaffner Achievement Award
 Scott L. Rindenow

Diversity Award
 HBO

References

External links
 

1999 film awards
1999 television awards
Directors Guild of America Awards
Direct
Direct
Directors
2000 in Los Angeles
March 2000 events in the United States